The Alla mia età Tour 2009–2010 is the fourth tour of the Italian singer Tiziano Ferro in support of his album Alla mia età.

At the end of the tour in Italy, on November 20 was released on DVD  Alla mia età - Live in Rome , recorded during the two concerts given by Tiziano Ferro at  Stadio Olimpico  of Rome on 24 and 25 June 2009.

Band

Christian Rigano: Keyboardist
Davide Tagliapietra: Guitarist
Alessandro De Crescenzo: Guitarist
Pino Saracini: Bassist
Mylious Johnson: Drummer
Leonardo d'Angilla: Percussionist

Setlist

Tour dates

External links
Tiziano Ferro Official Website

References

2009 concert tours
2010 concert tours
Tiziano Ferro